Camisa disease is the variant form of Vohwinkel syndrome, characterized by ichthyosis and normal hearing.

It is associated with loricrin.

It was characterized in 1984 and 1988.

See also
 Palmoplantar keratoderma
 Keratoderma
 List of cutaneous conditions

References

External links 

Palmoplantar keratodermas